This compilation album was released halfway through 2003 by De La Soul and was a mix of all their greatest hits over the years.

Track listing

Standard Edition CD1
 "Me Myself and I"
 "Say No Go"
 "Eye Know"
 "The Magic Number"
 "Potholes in My Lawn"
 "Buddy" (feat. Jungle Brothers and Q-Tip)
 "Ring Ring Ring (Ha Ha Hey)"
 "A Roller Skating Jam Named "Saturdays"" (feat. Q-Tip and Vinia Mojica)
 "Keepin' the Faith"
 "Breakadawn"
 "Stakes Is High"
 "4 More" (feat. Zhane)
 "Oooh." (feat. Redman)
 "All Good?" (feat. Chaka Khan)
 "Thru Ya City" (feat. D.V. Alias Khrist)
 "Baby Phat" (feat. Devin the Dude and Yummy Bingham)
 "Watch Out"

Limited Edition CD2
	"Buddy" (Native Tongue Decision Version) (feat. Jungle Brothers, Q-Tip, and Phife)
	"Stakes Is High" (Remix) (feat. Mos Def and Truth Enola)
	"Bizness" (feat. Common)
	"Stone Age" (feat. Biz Markie)
	"Big Brother Beat" (feat. Mos Def)
	"4 More" (Clean Version) (feat. Zhane)
	"So Good" (feat. Camp Lo)
	"I.C. Y'All" (feat. Busta Rhymes)
	"Held Down" (feat. Cee-Lo Green)
	"What We Do (For Love)" (feat. Slick Rick)

Charts and certifications

Weekly charts

Certifications

References

De La Soul albums
2003 greatest hits albums